Under Wraps is a 1997 American television comedy film directed by Greg Beeman and starring Bill Fagerbakke (in a dual role), Adam Wylie, Mario Yedidia, and Clara Bryant, and the first Disney Channel Original Movie (DCOM) by Disney Channel. This television film was shot in Chico, California. It is also Disney Channel's first horror-themed television film. It was included by the network in its 100 DCOMs celebration from May–June 2016.

Plot

Marshall (Mario Yedidia) is a monster movie-obsessed preteen, and though his friends Amy (Clara Bryant) and Gilbert (Adam Wylie) aren't as enthusiastic about his interest, the three friends are still very close. They discover an Egyptian mummy in the basement of a "dead" man's house. Because of an ancient amulet and the moonlight being in the right place at the right time, the mummy rises from the dead. The kids are initially afraid, but with time they discover he means them no harm; he's simply clumsy and confused. Marshall in particular bonds with the mummy, naming him "Harold" (explaining that the mummy reminds him of his Uncle Harold). The group decides they need to hide Harold, and attempt to find a way to help him now that they are becoming friends. After paying a visit to Bruce, a local shop owner who has a vast collection of monster-related items and knowledge of mythological/supernatural facts, they discover that if the mummy is not put back in his sarcophagus before midnight on Halloween, the mummy will cease to exist.

However, the sarcophagus is in the hands of the "dead" man, known as Mr. Kubat, who feigned his death to avoid paying his taxes. He's also involved with several illegal schemes, some involving ancient Egyptian artifacts- which is why he had a mummy hidden in his basement. Upon finding out that the mummy has "escaped" from the coffin, he orders his henchmen to look for it and bring it back in time, as he is selling it to an interested buyer. The children now have to keep Harold safe from attracting attention of local people in town, as well as protect him from the henchmen. As the Halloween deadline draws closer, the children also discover that in his previous life, Harold was in love, and wishes to be reunited with his lover. At a Halloween party, Harold can at least hide in the open since most people assume he is a normal person in costume. But when some of his bandages are pulled back from his face, it reveals he's not alive. Harold is captured, and his friends get Bruce to help them in their rescue plan (using some creative Halloween props, and Gilbert making both a dangerous and daring attempt by driving a car through a wall). After several incidents, the group finally figures out how to work together, foiling the plans of Mr. Kubat, as well as bringing Harold and his beloved back together before they return to their rest peacefully.

Cast
Adam Wylie as Gilbert Anderson
Mario Yedidia as Marshall
Clara Bryant as Amy
Bill Fagerbakke as Harold, a mummy.
Fagerbakke also portrays Ted, Marshall's stepfather.
Ken Campbell as Bruce
Ed Lauter as Mr. Kubat, the main antagonist of the film.
Corinne Bohrer as Marshall's Mom
Tom Virtue as Movie Dad
Laura Leary as Movie Mom
Penny Peyser as Amy's Mom
Telly Blackwood as Window Shopper
Trenton Gaucher as Movie Ben
Brooke Garrett as Movie Molly
Joshua Dennis as Leonard
Ryan Schofield as Todd
Nakia Burrise as Paige
Velina Brown as Mother in Park
Robert Bailey Jr. as Boy in Park
Wilma Bonet as Desk Nurse
Atim Udoffia as E.R. Nurse
Greg Watanabe as Doctor
Linda Gehringer as Connie
Kenneth Fisher as Principal Phil Hammer
Anni Long as Jane
Louis Landman as Kubat's Goon
Sean McFarland as Goon at Window
Lance Brady as Art Dealer
Rueben Grundy as Cop
Christina Patterson as Female Mummy
Joel McDonell as Doctor (uncredited)
Rusty Nelson as Doctor (uncredited)

Home media
The film was unavailable on home video until 2005, when Echo Bridge Entertainment released it on DVD. It is now available on iTunes and Amazon Video. As of 2022, Disney's streaming service has not added the film.

2021 remake & sequel

On November 13, 2020, it was announced that a remake of the film would premiere in October 2021 with Christian J. Simon, Malachi Barton, Sophia Hammons, and Phil Wright starring and Alex Zamm directing and co-writing the remake with William Robertson. A sequel was announced on February 7, 2022. The sequel, titled Under Wraps 2, was released on September 25, 2022.

References

External links

1997 television films
1997 films
1997 comedy films
1990s monster movies
American films about Halloween
American comedy television films
American monster movies
Disney Channel Original Movie films
Mummy films
Films directed by Greg Beeman
Films scored by David Michael Frank
1990s American films